Department of Health is a department of Government of Balochistan, Pakistan. The department is a standard body for providing public health, medical education, training and employment in the Balochistan.

It is headed by the Health Minister of Balochistan on democratic level, while controlled by the Secretary Health as well as the Director General Health Services Balochistan on bureaucratic level.

See also
 Ministry of National Health Services Regulation and Coordination
 Health care in Pakistan
 Ministry of Public Health (Sindh)
 Punjab Health Department

External links
 Ministry of Health Balochistan

References

Departments of Government of Balochistan
Medical and health organisations based in Pakistan
Healthcare in Balochistan
Balochistan
Government agencies of Balochistan, Pakistan